Antonio Pucci may refer to:

 Antonio Pucci (poet) (c. 1310–1388), Florentine poet
 Antonio di Puccio Pucci (c. 1350–after 1416), Florentine politician and architect
 Antonio Pucci (cardinal) (1485–1544), Italian cardinal
 Antonio Maria Pucci (1819–1892), Italian saint
 Antonio Pucci (racing driver) (1923–2009), Italian race driver